Gasdermin C is a protein that in humans is encoded by the GSDMC gene.

References

Further reading